Tullberg's woodpecker (Campethera tullbergi) is a species of bird in the family Picidae.
It is found in western Cameroon, adjacent Nigeria and Bioko island.

The common name and Latin binomial commemorates the Swedish zoologist Tycho Fredrik Hugo Tullberg (1842-1920).

References

Further reading

External links
Avibase 
Tanzania Birds 
AVoCet 

Tullberg's woodpecker
Birds of the Gulf of Guinea
Birds of Central Africa
Tullberg's woodpecker
Taxonomy articles created by Polbot